Grupo Posadas, S.A.B. de C.V. or Posadas is a hospitality company based in Mexico City. It owns, leases, operates and manages hotels, resorts and villas with its several different brands. As of 2020, the company operates more than 150 hotels with 24,000 hotel rooms.

Aviation 
In 2005, Grupo Posadas took control of Mexicana de Aviación, Mexico's second largest airline group. Over the next few years, the new owners shifted their business focus from the airline group's largest but least profitable airline, Mexicana, toward its two smaller but more profitable affiliates, MexicanaClick and MexicanaLink. The Mexicana unit was eventually stripped and sold after a long dispute with the airline's unions failed to produce any significant givebacks by unions.   MexicanaClick and MexicanaLink are also now defunct.

Hospitality 
Groupo Posadas appears to have refocused on its core business in the hospitality industry and continues to operate several large Mexican hospitality brands, including the Mexico-wide Fiesta Inn, Fiesta Americana, and Grand Fiesta Americana, as well as IOH Freestyle Hotels, One Hotels, Gamma Hotels, The Explorean and Live Aqua.

History 
In 2012, Grupo Posadas sold its South American brands Caesar and Caesar Business to Accor Hotels.  This appears to be a refocusing on the Mexican hospitality industry.

Fiesta Rewards 
Fiesta Rewards is Grupo Posada's frequent traveler program for its hospitality brands.

References

Hotel chains in Mexico
Hospitality companies established in 1967
Hospitality companies of Mexico
Hospitality companies
Companies based in Mexico City
Mexican companies established in 1967
Companies that filed for Chapter 11 bankruptcy in 2021